The 2017 Arab Club Championship qualifying rounds were played from 14 September 2016 to 4 March 2017. A total of 11 teams from 11 associations from Africa and Asia competed in the qualifying rounds to decide which 3 teams would qualify for the group stage of the 2017 Arab Club Championship held in Egypt, alongside 9 automatically qualified teams.

Teams
The following 11 teams (6 from Asia and 5 from Africa) were entered into the qualifying rounds:

Preliminary round 1

Asia Zone

|-

|}

Africa Zone

Notes

Preliminary round 2

|-
!colspan=5|Asia Zone

|-
!colspan=5|Africa Zone

|}

Asia Zone

Africa Zone

Play-off round

|-
!colspan=5|Asia Zone

|-
!colspan=5|Africa Zone

|}

Asia Zone

Africa Zone

Qualified teams
3 teams qualified to the 2017 Arab Club Championship final tournament held in Egypt, joining 9 other teams that qualified automatically.

Qualified teams
 Naft Al-Wasat
 Al-Ahed
 Al-Merrikh

Teams qualified automatically
 NA Hussein Dey
 Al-Ahly
 Zamalek
 Al-Faisaly
 Fath Union Sport
 Al-Hilal
 Al-Nassr
 Espérance de Tunis
 Al-Wahda

Top scorers

References

External links
UAFA Official website 

2016-17